St. Catherine of Siena School may refer to:

St. Catherine of Siena School (Martinez, California)
St. Catherine of Siena School (Norwood, Massachusetts)